This is a list of human pseudogenes that are known to be disabled genes.

 WNT3A pseudogene, associated with the growth of a tail
 NCF1C pseudogene, associated with a type of white blood cell. It makes part of the neutrophil NADPH oxidase enzyme, which makes superoxide anion.
 GULO pseudogene, associated with the production of Vitamin C
 IRGM pseudogene, associated with the immune system
 hHaA pseudogene, associated with fur-like body hair: see hypertrichosis
 DEFT1P pseudogene, associated with the immune system
 Urate oxidase pseudogene, associated with the processing of uric acid
 Photolyase pseudogene, associated with repairing DNA damaged by UV radiation
 Photolyase is no longer encoded for despite obvious advantages. Instead, this gene is mutated to encode for cryptochromes.

References

 
Pseudo